Military University of Technology (MUT,  – WAT) is the civil-military technical academic institution in Poland, located at Bemowo, Warsaw. It was established in 1951. The university's rector-commander is płk. Przemysław Wachulak. The university is supervised by the Minister of National Defence of Poland and conducts scientific research for the needs of Polish Armed Forces. Currently the university educates almost 10,000 students. The staff consists of about 1,000 employees, including 220 professors.

University leads both military and civilian studies. Military graduates receive not only professional title of magister inżynier, but are also promoted to military rank of podporucznik (second lieutenant). Formally being professional soldiers, military students attend school on the principles of ordinary military service. They are quartered in military dormitories and attend a variety of different military trainings and lectures. After graduating, they are formally obliged to serve in Polish Armed Forces under threat of reimbursement of education costs. Only Polish citizens are eligible for military studies.

Contrary to military students, civilian ones can study normally, without any commitments to the Ministry of National Defence. Civilian studies allow to obtain professional titles such as: inżynier or licencjat (first cycle studies), magister inżynier or magister (second cycle studies) and a scientific degree of doktor. Due to changes in Polish law, since October 2019, separate Doctoral School operates in the structure of MUT. Full-time studies are free, extramural studies are payable.

Obviously, scientific research conducted in MUT focus on issues connected with military and national defense. MUT was the place where in 1963 first Polish laser was created. In 1964 analog computer ELWAT (later produced by Elwro in Wrocław) was also created in MUT. One of the biggest contemporary projects which was developed at the university was so-called Modular Firearm System, 5.56 mm MSBS rifle, currently manufactured and further developed by FB "Łucznik" Radom. The rifle is to become the next main service rifle of the Polish Armed Forces.

Faculties 
MUT consists of eight faculties.

 Faculty of Cybernetics,
 Faculty of Electronics,
 Faculty of Civil Engineering and Geodesy,
 Faculty of Logistics,
 Faculty of Mechanical Engineering,
 Faculty of Mechatronics and Aviation,
 Faculty of Advanced Technologies and Chemistry,
 Institute of Optoelectronics.

See also 

 National Defence University of Warsaw
 Warsaw University of Technology
 Dzerzhinsky Political-Military Academy in Warsaw

References

External links 

 

Universities and colleges in Warsaw
Bemowo
Educational institutions established in 1951
Science and technology in Poland
Military education and training in Poland
1951 establishments in Poland